

The Blériot-SPAD S.81 (S.81 C.1) was a French fighter aircraft developed in 1923 to a requirement by the French Air Force. It was flown competitively against the Dewoitine D.1 and was selected over that aircraft due to the Dewoitine's more radical design, leading to an order for 80 aircraft. The S.81 was a single-bay biplane of conventional configuration with I-shaped interplane struts and lacking Herbemont's usual swept upper wing. It featured a wooden fuselage of monocoque construction and metal wings skinned in fabric. Production versions differed from the prototypes in having a lengthened fuselage and larger tail fin.

Variants

S.81.01two prototypes, powered by a  Hispano-Suiza 8Fb V-8 engine. The second aircraft was used for static tests only

S.81/1production version, powered by a  Hispano-Suiza 8Fb V-8 engines, designated S.81 C.1 (S.81 Chasseur - single-seater) in air force service.

S.81bissingle example of racer version developed for the Coupe Michelin race. Performance poor.

S.81/2single machine to evaluate alternative radiator design.

S.81/3single machine to evaluate alternative radiator design

S.81/4single machine to evaluate wooden wing design

S.81/6racer converted from the S.81-bis

Operators

 French Air Force
 2ème Fighter Regiment

Specifications (S.81/1)

See also

References

Bibliography

Further reading
 Taylor, John W. R., and Jean Alexander. "Combat Aircraft of the World" New York: G.P. Putnam's Sons, 1969 Library of Congress Catalog Card Number 68-25459 (Pg.130-131)
 
 

1920s French fighter aircraft
Blériot aircraft
Biplanes
Single-engined tractor aircraft
Racing aircraft
Aircraft first flown in 1923